Ronald Layne Beaubien (born July 4, 1976) is an American water polo player. He was a member of the United States men's national water polo team at the 2008 Beijing Olympics. In the championship game, the USA team won the silver medal, after defeat by Hungary.

Considered to be one of the top all-around players in the world during his career, Beaubien boasted one of the strongest shooting arms on Team USA for over a decade.  During his 15-year career he competed in three Summer Olympic Games (Athens '04, Beijing '08, London '12), five World Championships (Fukuoka '01, Barcelona '03, Melbourne '07, Rome '09, Shanghai '11), and played in the professional leagues of Hungary, Greece, France, and Brazil. In 2008 he became the first American in the sports history to win National Club Championships on three continents (New York Athletic Club USA '05, Fluminense Brazil '06, Marseille France '08.) 

In addition to winning the silver medal at the 2008 Olympic Games, Beaubien is a three-time Pan-American Gold medalist (Santo Domingo '03, Rio de Janeiro '07, Guadalajara '11).

He attended Coronado High School, Coronado, California and graduated in the class of 1994. Beaubien played for the water polo team while a student at Stanford University and won one national championship ('94.)

Beaubien was inducted into the USA Water Polo Hall of Fame in August 2022.

See also
 List of Olympic medalists in water polo (men)

References

External links
 

1976 births
Living people
American male water polo players
Water polo drivers
Stanford Cardinal men's water polo players
Water polo players at the 2004 Summer Olympics
Water polo players at the 2008 Summer Olympics
Water polo players at the 2012 Summer Olympics
Medalists at the 2008 Summer Olympics
Olympic silver medalists for the United States in water polo
Water polo players at the 2007 Pan American Games
Water polo players at the 2011 Pan American Games
Pan American Games medalists in water polo
Pan American Games gold medalists for the United States
Medalists at the 2011 Pan American Games